Cool Spring Place, also known as Cool Spring Tavern, is a historic home located at Fayetteville, Cumberland County, North Carolina. It was built in 1788, and is a two-story, five bay by four bay, rectangular Federal style frame dwelling.  It low hipped roof and features a double porch on the front facade. It operated as a tavern until 1795, and is believed to be the oldest existing structure in the city of Fayetteville, having survived the disastrous fire of 1831.

It was listed on the National Register of Historic Places in 1972.

References

External links

Historic American Buildings Survey in North Carolina
Houses on the National Register of Historic Places in North Carolina
Federal architecture in North Carolina
Houses completed in 1788
Houses in Fayetteville, North Carolina
National Register of Historic Places in Cumberland County, North Carolina
1788 establishments in North Carolina